The 200 Most Influential Muslims (also known as The Muslim 400) is an annual publication first published in 2009, which ranks the most influential Muslims in the world.

The publication is compiled by the Royal Islamic Strategic Studies Centre in Amman, Jordan. The report is issued annually in cooperation with Prince  Al Waleed bin Talal at Georgetown University in the United States.

Turkey's President Recep Tayyip Erdoğan took 1st place in the 2021 edition. He was followed by: Salman of Saudi Arabia or Salman of Saudi Arabia; The Algerian’s Abdelmadjid Tebboune; The King Abdullah II of Jordan; The King Mohammed VI of Morocco; Iranian’s Leader Sayyid Ali Khamenei; The President of the UAE Mohammed bin Zayed Al Nahyan; and the Pakistani Scholar Muhammad Taqi Usmani are among the list.

Critics have noted that its top 50 list gives more weight to political leaders, who due to the nature of political systems in Middle East enjoy considerable clout and influence in the regional politics. As such the influence of individuals listed in the top 50 owes much to the fact of their existence in the political spectrum.

.

Overview
The publication highlights people who are influential as Muslims. That is people whose influence is derived from their practice of Islam or from the fact that they are Muslim. The influence can be of a religious scholar directly addressing Muslims and influencing their beliefs, ideas and behaviour, or it can be of a ruler shaping the socio-economic factors within which people live their lives, or of artists shaping popular culture. The first two examples also point to the fact that the lists, and especially the Top 50, are dominated by religious scholars and heads of state. Their dominant and lasting influence cannot be denied, especially the rulers, who in many cases also appoint religious scholars to their respective positions.

Nominations are evaluated on the basis of the influence that particular Muslims have had within the Muslim community and the manner in which their influence has benefited the Muslim community, both within the Islamic world and in terms of representing Islam to non-Muslims. "Influential" for the purposes of the book is defined as "any person who has the power (be it cultural, ideological, financial, political or otherwise) to make a change that will have a significant impact on the Muslim World".

The publication defines eligible entries with the following: "Traditional Islam (96% of the world's Muslims): Also known as Orthodox Islam, this ideology is not politicized and largely based on consensus of correct opinion—thus including the Sunni, Shi'a, and Ibadi branches of practice (and their subgroups) within the fold of Islam, and not groups such as the Druze or the Ahmadiyya, among others."

The book starts with an overall top 50, ranked the most influential Muslims in the world. The remaining 450 most prominent Muslims is broken down into 15 categories without ranking, of scholarly, political, administrative, lineage, preachers and spiritual guides, women, youth, philanthropy/charity, development, science and technology, arts and culture, Quran reciters, media, radicals, international Islamic networks and issues of the day. Each year the biographies are updated.

The publication also gives an insight into the different ways that Muslims impact the world and also shows the diversity of how people are living as Muslims today. The book's appendices comprehensively list populations of Muslims in nations worldwide, and its introduction gives a snapshot view of different ideological movements within the Muslim world, breaking down clearly distinctions between traditional Islam and recent radical innovations.

Publications

2008|2009 edition
In 2009, the book was edited by Professors John L. Esposito and Ibrahim Kalin at Georgetown University in Washington.

The 500 most influential Muslims were chosen largely in terms of their overt influence. The top 50 is dominated by religious scholars and either heads of state, which automatically gives them an advantage when it comes to influence, or they have inherited their position. Lineage is a significant factor – it has its own category – and the predisposition to include children of important people reveals a mindset that indicates achievement is an optional extra. The top 50 fits into six broad categories as follows: 12 are political leaders (kings, generals, presidents), four are spiritual leaders (Sufi shaykhs), 14 are national or international religious authorities, three are "preachers", six are high-level scholars, 11 are leaders of movements or organizations.

The book has given the first place to King Abdullah bin Abdulaziz of Saudi Arabia. Second place went to Ayatollah Syed Ali Khamenei, the spiritual leader of Iran. King Mohammed VI of Morocco found third place and King Abdullah II Al-Hussain of Jordan occupied fourth place. Fifth place went to Turkey's Prime Minister Recep Tayyip Erdoğan.

The first solely religious leader is Iraq's Ayatollah Ali al-Sistani in seventh place. Fethullah Gülen came 13th. The heads of Hezbollah; Seyyed Hassan Nasrallah listed 17th and Hamas Khaled Mashaal listed 34th.

The highest-ranking American (and highest-ranking convert) at 38th place was Sheikh Hamza Yusuf Hanson, founder of the Zaytuna Institute in Berkeley, California. Right after him comes the highest-ranking European, Sheikh Mustafa Cerić, grand mufti of Bosnia and Herzegovina.

In total 72 Americans are among the 500, a disproportionately strong showing. Timothy Winter (Abdal Hakim Murad) was the highest ranked British Muslim, in an unspecified position between 51st and 60th, considerably higher than the three other British people who made the list – the Conservative Party chairman Baroness Sayeeda Warsi; the UK's first Muslim life peer, Lord Nazir Ahmed; and Dr Anas Al Shaikh Ali, director of the International Institute of Islamic Thought.

The women featured had a separate section from the men. There were only three women listed in the top 50. Sheikha Munira al-Qubaysi (number 21), an educator of girls and women; Queen Rania of Jordan (number 37), who promotes global education; and Sheikha Mozah bint Nasser Al Missned of Qatar (number 38), who is chairwoman of the Qatar Foundation for Education, Science and Community Development.

The listing also includes an extensive Arts and Culture Section. The general Arts and Culture Section included the names of singers Salif Keita, Youssou N'Dour, Raihan, Yusuf Islam and Sami Yusuf, Dawud Wharnsby; musician A. R. Rahman (India); film stars Aamir Khan and Shahrukh Khan; comedian Azhar Usman and martial artist Ma Yue. All the Qāriʾs (Quran reciters) listed in the book are from Saudi Arabia.

Foreign Policy magazine's Marc Lynch stated, "Esposito and Kalin's methodology seems strange. Any list in which the Sultan of Oman (Qaboos bin Said al Said, who was sixth) outranks, say, Turkish preacher Fethullah Gülen (placed 13th) or the Aga Khan (Aga Khan IV, who was placed 20th) seems odd to this observer..."

2010 edition:

2010|2011* edition
In 2011, achievements of a lifetime were given more weight than achievements within the current year. which meant that the lists of names were going to change gradually, rather than dramatically, year-on-year. The Arab Spring had no impact on Saudi King Abdullah of Saudi Arabia's influence, it had boosted King Mohammed VI of Morocco's influence, who moved up to second place, and it had no effect on Turkish Prime Minister Recep Tayyip Erdoğan who came in third place.

Erdoğan was expected by many to receive the top spot in light of the Arab Spring. Erdoğan was credited with Turkey's "Muslim democracy", and was seen as the leader of a country that, as the Brookings Institution said, "played the 'most constructive' role in the Arab events."

Emir of Qatar Sheikh Hamad bin Khalifa Al Thani influence rose during the Arab Spring, moving him to sixth place. He had driven much of the Arab Spring through the coverage given by Al Jazeera, given financial support to protesters and political support to Libya, making him arguably the biggest enabler of the Arab Spring.

2012 edition
In 2012, the edition was published by S. Abdallah Schleifer, Professor Emeritus and Senior Fellow Kamal Adham Center for Television & Digital Journalism, The American University in Cairo.

There were more Muslims from America than any other country again with 41 spots on the 500 list. Countries with the next highest number of names were Egypt, Pakistan, Saudi Arabia, and the United Kingdom, with 25 Muslims each, followed by Indonesia, with 24. It lists the winners according to 13 categories, including spiritual guides, Quran reciters, scholars, politicians, celebrities, sports figures, radicals, and media leaders.

For the fourth year running, Saudi King Abdullah bin Abdulaziz topped the list. He was followed by Turkish Prime Minister Recep Tayyip Erdoğan at second place. Erdoğan's advance gave him advantage over Moroccan King Mohammed VI who took the third place. Fourth place went to Dr Mohammed Badie, whose name appeared in the top 10 for the first time. He was followed by Qatari Emir Sheikh Hamad bin Khalifa Al Thani who took the fifth place. Sheikh Al-Azhar Dr. Ahmad el-Tayeb and prominent Islamic scholar Dr. Yusuf al-Qaradawi who is President of Global Association of Muslim Scholars, also made it to the top 10 ranks.

2012|2013* edition
In 2013, the list was edited once again by Professor Emeritus S. Abdallah Schleifer of the American University in the capital city: Cairo.

The top of the list went to Sheikh Ahmed el-Tayeb, The Grand Mufti Sheikh of the Al Azhar University for the prominent role played by him in Egypt's troubled democratic transition. His astute decision making over the past couple of years has preserved the traditional approach of Al-Azhar which faced threats from Islamists and Salafis in the years that have followed Mubarak's fall. His public support of General: Abdel Fattah el-Sisi's coup also gave it a strong religious grounding that was necessary for it to achieve the legitimacy needed to prevent a “civil wars”, effectively making him a "king-maker" and cementing his place at the top of the list. He was followed on the listing by Saudi King: Abdullah bin Abdul-Aziz Al-Saud: and the “IRANIANS” Grand Leader: Sayyid Ali Khamenei; plus  the sixth president of Iran from 2005 to 2013: Mahmoud Sabbaghian or Mahmoud Ahmadinejad.

Reflective of the wider trajectory of the Arab Spring in The Arab World “Arabs & Hebrews” in Palestine” . That year's list showed It will not a decline it’s influence in the Middle East’s Politics as. : WE’RE “who” ARE: The Society of the Muslim Brothers: The “TRANSNATIONAL SUNNI ISLAMIC ORIGINATION”: or The Muslim Brotherhood’s; the Muslim Brothers; or Brothers. An associated figures is Dr.Mohammed Badie, Sheikh Yusuf al Qaradawi and ousted Egyptian President: Mohammed Morsi: (Mohammed Mohamed) or Just Dr. “MORSY” And The Coup Kingpin General: Abdel Fattah el-Sisi who was previously unlisted now ranks at 29.

The United States dominates that list again with 41 inclusions including Muhammad Ali, Dr Mehmet Oz, Rep. Keith Ellison, Yasiin Bey (Mos Def), and Fareed Zakaria. Representing the UK are Mo Farah, Yusuf Islam, Riz Khan, Baroness Sayeeda Warsi, Cambridge's Dr Timothy Winter and 18 others.

2014|2015 edition
In 2014, the chief editor of the list was again Professor S Abdallah Schleifer. The top spot went back to Saudi King Abdullah bin Abdul Aziz al-Saud, due to his being the "absolute monarch of the most powerful Arab nation." The list accords him the place in light of Saudi Arabia being home to Islam's two holy cities of Makkah and Madinah, which millions of Muslims visit throughout the year, as well as the kingdom's oil exports. Rounding out the top three are Dr Muhammad Ahmed al-Tayeb, grand sheikh of Al-Azhar University and grand imam of Al-Azhar mosque, and Iran's Supreme Leader Ali Khamenei. The top nine are all political leaders and royals, including Morocco's King Mohammed VI and Turkish President Recep Tayyip Erdoğan.

The top 50 fit into six broad categories: 12 are political leaders (kings, generals, presidents), four are spiritual leaders (Sufi shaykhs), 14 are national or international religious authorities, three are "preachers", six are high-level scholars, 11 are leaders of movements or organizations. In total 72 Americans are among the 500 most influential Muslims, a disproportionately strong showing, but only one among the top 50, Sheikh Hamza Yusuf Hanson of Zaytuna Institute listed at number 38.

2016 edition
In 2015, the top 50 was again dominated by religious scholars and heads of state. The top five, was King Abdullah of Jordan; Ahmed el-Tayeb, the grand sheikh of Egypt's Al-Azhar University; King Salman of Saudi Arabia; Iran's supreme leader Ayatollah Ali Khamenei; and King Mohammed VI of Morocco. Turkish President Recep Tayyip Erdogan came in at Number eight, but surprisingly Syrian President Bashar al-Assad did not make the Top 50 this year or last, though he is still listed in the 500. The prime minister of Iraq did not make the list, but Iraq's Grand Ayatollah Sayyid Ali Hussein Sistani did, coming in at number nine.

There were 32 newcomers to the 2016 list. 22 Indians featured on the list. As in past years, there continued to be more Muslims from the United States than any other country. Since at least 2012, the U.S. has outpaced nations with a far larger Muslim population, with at least 40 notable people of influence, with Pakistan (33), Saudi Arabia (32), Egypt (27) and the UK (27).

2017 edition 

In 2017, the top five were Sheikh Ahmad al-Tayyeb of Egypt.

King Abdullah II of Jordan of Jordan. 
King Salman of Saudi Arabia.:

King Mohammed VI of Morocco.

Ayatollah: Sayyid Ali Khamenei of Iran;

2018 edition

In 2018, the top five were Sheikh Ahmad Muhammad Al-Tayeeb of Egypt; King Salman bin Abdul-Aziz Al-Saud of Saudi Arabia; King Abdullah II Ibn Al-Hussein of Jordan; The  Ayatollah; Sayyid Ali Khamenei of Iran; President Recep Tayyip Erdoğan of Turkey.

2018|2019 edition

In 2019, the top five were: King Salman bin Abdul-Aziz Al-Saud of Saudi Arabia; King Abdullah II Ibn Al-Hussein of Jordan.:

The President of Algeria: Abdelmadjid Tebboune; King Mohammad VI of Morocco.:

The  Ayatollah of Iranians:  Sayyid Ali Khamenei of Persians.:

The President Recep Tayyip Erdoğan of Turkey.:

2020 edition
In 2020, the top five were: Salman bin Abdulaziz Al Saud of Saudi Arabia:

King Abdullah II Ibn Al-Hussein of Jordan.:

President Recep Tayyip Erdoğan of Turkey.:

Ayatollah Hajj Sayyid Ali Khamenei of Iran.

Sheikh Mufti Muhammad Taqi Usmani of Pakistan.

The Woman of the Year was Rashida Tlaib of the United States and the Man of the Year was Imran Khan of Pakistan.

2021 edition
In 2021, the top five were: King Salman bin Abdulaziz Al Saud of Saudi Arabia: 
King Abdullah II Ibn Al-Hussein of Jordan.

Hajj Sayyid Ali Khamenei of Iran; 
President Recep Tayyip Erdoğan president of Turkey;

The Woman of the Year was Bilkis Bano of India and the Man of the Year was Ilham Tohti of China.

2022 edition
In 2022, the top five were Sheikh Tamim bin Hamad Al-Thani of Qatar; King Salman bin Abdulaziz Al Saud of Saudi Arabia; Ayatollah Hajj Sayyid Ali Khamenei of Iran; President Recep Tayyib Erdoğan of Turkey.

The Woman of the Year was President Samia Suluhu Hassan of Tanzania and the Man of the Year was Uğur Şahin of Germany.

2023 edition
In 2023, the top five were Salman bin Abdul-Aziz Al-Saud King of Saudi Arabia, Custodian of the Two Holy Mosques, and the Sheikh Tamim bin Hamid Al-Thani Emir of Qatar.:

Turkish President Recep Tayyip Erdoğan.:

Plus the Ayatollah: Sayyid Ali Khamenei Supreme Leader of Iranians the Persians.:

The Woman of the Year was Aisha Abdurrahman Bewley and the Man of the Year was Mahmood Madani President of Jamiat Ulama-i-Hind from Hindustani Continents.

Current top Nine

See also
The Muslim 100
The 100: A Ranking of the Most Influential Persons in History
Forbes list of The World's Most Powerful People
Who's Who

References

External links

The 500 Most Influential Muslims 2009 on Google Books

A Defense of the Powerful: The Muslim 500. The Islamic Monthly. June 18, 2012
List of “Most Influential Muslims” Illustrates the Problem – and Presents Opportunities. American Islamic Forum for Democracy. November 30, 2012

2009 non-fiction books
International biographical dictionaries
Muslim 500